A whistle is an instrument which produces sound from a stream of gas, most commonly air. It may be mouth-operated, or powered by air pressure, steam, or other means. Whistles vary in size from a small slide whistle or nose flute type to a large multi-piped church organ.

Whistles have been around since early humans first carved out a gourd or branch and found they could make sound with it. In prehistoric Egypt, small shells were used as whistles. Many present day wind instruments are inheritors of these early whistles. With the rise of more mechanical power, other forms of whistles have been developed.

One characteristic of a whistle is that it creates a pure, or nearly pure, tone. The conversion of flow energy to sound comes from an interaction between a solid material and a fluid stream. The forces in some whistles are sufficient to set the solid material in motion. Classic examples are Aeolian tones that result in galloping power lines, or the Tacoma Narrows Bridge (the so-called "Galloping Gertie" of popular media). Other examples are circular disks set into vibration.

History

Early whistles

Whistles made of bone or wood have been used for thousands of years. Whistles were used by the Ancient Greeks to keep the stroke of galley slaves. 
Archaeologist have found at the ruins of the ancient Greek city of Assos a terracotta whistle, most probably a child’s toy putting in children’s graves as a burial gift.
The English used whistles during the Crusades to signal orders to archers. Boatswain pipes were also used in the age of sail aboard naval vessels to issue commands and salute dignitaries.

Joseph Hudson

Joseph Hudson set up J Hudson & Co in Birmingham in 1870. With his younger brother James, he designed the "Acme City" brass whistle. This became the first referee whistle used at association football matches during the 1878–79 Football Association Cup match between Nottingham Forest and Sheffield. Prior to the introduction of the whistle, handkerchiefs were used by the umpires to signal to the players.

In 1883, he began experimenting with pea-whistle designs that could produce an intense sound that could grab attention from over a mile away. His invention was discovered by accident when he dropped his violin and it shattered on the floor. Observing how the discordant sound of the breaking strings travelled (trill effect), Hudson had the idea to put a pea in the whistle. Prior to this, whistles were much quieter and were only thought of as musical instruments or toys for children. After observing the problems that local police were having with effectively communicating with rattles, he realised that his whistle designs could be used as an effective aid to their work.

Hudson demonstrated his whistle to Scotland Yard and was awarded his first contract in 1884. Both rattles and whistles were used to call for back-up in areas where neighbourhood beats overlapped, and following their success in the Metropolitan Police of London, the whistle was adopted by most police forces in the United Kingdom.

World War I 
During World War I, officers of the British Army and United States Army used whistles to communicate with troops, command charges and warn when artillery pieces where going to fire. Most whistles used by the British were manufactured by J & Hudson Co.

See also

 Vessel flute (acoustics of whistles and tunable whistles)
 Low whistle (low-pitched tinwhistle or flageolet)
 Liquid whistle (mixes fluids)
 Physics of whistles
 Firedamp whistle (for detecting methane in mines)
 Whistler (radio) (very low frequency radio feature caused by lightning and atmospheric effects)
 Rossby whistle (climate oscillation of the Caribbean)

References

External links
 
 
 
 Whistle (Polish folk musical instruments)

Internal fipple flutes
 
Blown percussion instruments
English musical instruments
Sports officiating technology
Toy instruments and noisemakers